Philip Seymour Hoffman (1967–2014) was an American actor, director, and producer who made his screen debut on the police procedural Law & Order in 1991. He made his film debut later in the same year by appearing in a minor role in Triple Bogey on a Par Five Hole. Hoffman followed this with supporting roles as a student in Scent of a Woman (1992), and a storm chaser in Twister (1996) before his breakthrough role as a gay boom operator in Paul Thomas Anderson's drama Boogie Nights (1997), for which he received critical acclaim. In the same year, he appeared in the Revolutionary War documentary series Liberty! (1997). Two years later, he played a kind nurse in Anderson's Magnolia and an arrogant playboy in The Talented Mr. Ripley, for which he received the National Board of Review Award for Best Supporting Actor. Hoffman made his Broadway debut the following year with his lead role in True West which garnered him a nomination for the Tony Award for Best Actor in a Play.

Hoffman received the Academy Award for Best Actor, BAFTA Award for Best Actor in a Leading Role, and Golden Globe Award for Best Actor – Motion Picture Drama for his portrayal of writer Truman Capote in the 2005 biographical film Capote. He followed this by playing a ruthless arms dealer in the action spy film Mission: Impossible III (2006) and CIA agent Gust Avrakotos in the Mike Nichols-directed Charlie Wilson's War (2007). Hoffman's performance as a priest suspected of child abuse in the period drama Doubt (2008) with Meryl Streep and Amy Adams  received critical acclaim and multiple award nominations in the Best Supporting Actor category. In the same year, he played a troubled theatre director in Charlie Kaufman's Synecdoche, New York.

In 2010, he made his directorial debut with the romantic comedy Jack Goes Boating, an adaptation of the 2007 play in which he had also starred. Two years later, he played a cult leader in Anderson's psychological drama The Master and Willy Loman in the play Death of a Salesman. For the former, Hoffman was nominated for the Best Supporting Actor Oscar, and for the latter he received a nomination for the Tony Award for Best Actor in a Play. He died of an accidental mixed drug overdose on February 2, 2014, at the age of 46. In his New York Times obituary, he was described as "perhaps the most ambitious and widely admired American actor of his generation". Broadway theatres dimmed their lights for one minute in tribute.

Film

Television

Stage

References
General

Specific

Male actor filmographies
American filmographies
Screen